Vasil Todorov (born 20 October 1944) is a Bulgarian former wrestler who competed in the 1972 Summer Olympics, where he finished fourth in the 100 kg category.

He was the bronze medalist at the 1969 and 1971 World Wrestling Championships, and fifth in 1970. He won four medals (3 silver, 1 bronze) at the European Wrestling Championships in the years 1968-1972.

References

External links
 

1944 births
Living people
Olympic wrestlers of Bulgaria
Wrestlers at the 1972 Summer Olympics
Bulgarian male sport wrestlers
Place of birth missing (living people)
20th-century Bulgarian people
21st-century Bulgarian people